In the United States, a pattern day trader is a Financial Industry Regulatory Authority (FINRA) designation for a stock trader who executes four or more day trades in five business days in a margin account, provided the number of day trades are more than six percent of the customer's total trading activity for that same five-day period.

A FINRA rule applies to any customer who buys and sells a particular security in the same trading day (day trades), and does this four or more times in any five consecutive business day period; the rule applies to margin accounts, but not to cash accounts.  A pattern day trader is subject to special rules. The main rule is that in order to engage in pattern day trading you must maintain an equity balance of at least $25,000 in a margin account. The required minimum equity must be in the account prior to any day trading activities. Three months must pass without a day trade for a person so classified to lose the restrictions imposed on them. Pursuant to NYSE 432, brokerage firms must maintain a daily record of required margin.

The minimum equity requirement in FINRA Rule 4210 was approved by the Securities and Exchange Commission (SEC) on February 27, 2001 by approving amendments to NASD Rule 2520.

Definition
A pattern day trader is generally defined in FINRA Rule 4210 (Margin Requirements) as any customer who executes four or more round-trip day trades within any five successive business days. FINRA Rule 4210 is substantially similar to New York Stock Exchange Rule 431. If, however, the number of day trades is less than or equal to 6% of the total number of trades that trader has made for that five business day period, the trader will not be considered a pattern day trader and will not be required to meet the criteria for a pattern day trader.

A non-pattern day trader (i.e. someone with only occasional day trades), can become designated a pattern day trader anytime if they meet the above criteria. If the brokerage firm knows, or reasonably believes a client who seeks to open or resume trading in an account will engage in pattern day trading, then the customer may immediately be deemed to be a pattern day trader without waiting five business days.

Round trip
A round trip is the opening and closing of a security position. Whether you buy or sell to open, when you close the position, you’ve completed a round trip.

Day trading refers to buying and then selling or selling short and then buying back the same security on the same day. Interpretation for more complex situations may be subject to interpretation by an individual brokerage firm.  For example, if you buy the same stock in three trades on the same day, and sell them all in one trade, that can be considered one day trade, or three day trades. If you buy stock in one trade and sell the position in three trades, that is generally considered as one day trade if all trades are done on the same day. Three more day trades in the next four business days will subject your account to restrictions (you can only close existing positions or purchase with available cash up front) for 90 days, or until you deposit enough to have $25,000 in your account, whichever comes first. Day trading also applies to trading in option contracts. Forced sales of securities through a margin call count towards the day trading calculation.

Requirements and restrictions
Under the rules of NYSE and Financial Industry Regulatory Authority, a trader who is deemed to be exhibiting a pattern of day trading is subject to the "Pattern Day Trader" rules and restrictions and is treated differently than a trader that holds positions overnight. In order to day trade:
 Day trading minimum equity: the account must maintain at least USD $25,000 worth of equity.
 Margin call to meet minimum equity: A day trading minimum equity call is issued when the pattern day trader account falls below $25,000. This minimum must be restored by means of cash deposit or other marginable equities.
 Deadline to meet calls: Pattern day traders are allowed to deposit funds within five business days to meet the margin call
 Non-withdrawal deposit requirement: This minimum equity or deposits of funds must remain in the account and cannot be withdrawn for at least two business days.
 Cross guarantees are prohibited: Pattern day traders are prohibited from utilizing cross guarantees to meet day-trading margin calls or to meet minimum equity requirements. Each day trading account is required to meet all margin requirements independently, using only the funds available in the account.
 Restrictions on accounts with unmet day trading calls: if the day trading call is not met, the account's day trading buying power will be restricted for 90 days or until day trading minimum equity (i.e. the margin call is met).

Day trading in cash accounts
The Pattern Day Trading rule regulates the use of margin and is defined only for margin accounts. Cash accounts, by definition, do not borrow on margin, so day trading is subject to separate rules regarding Cash Accounts. Cash account holders may still engage in certain day trades, as long as the activity does not result in free riding, which is the sale of securities bought with unsettled funds. An instance of free-riding will cause a cash account to be restricted for 90 days to purchasing securities with cash up front. Under Regulation T, brokers must freeze an investor's account for 90 days if the investor sells securities that have not been fully paid (i.e. paid for with unavailable funds). During this 90-day period, the investor must fully pay for any purchase on the date of the trade.

References

Share trading
Stock traders